Bestie is a 2022 Indian Tamil-language horror film directed by Ranga Kumar and starring Ashok Kumar and Yashika Aannand. It was released on 8 July 2022.

Plot
Lovers Ashok and Yashika decided to take a vacation, and they went to stay in a farmhouse. They met strangers, and disturbing things happened to both of the lovers. The most disappointing thing for Ashok is that Yashika and her family members did that. Strangers are Yashika's family members, and they planned to revenge Ashok and his friends because they raped Yashika's sister Priyanka. As per their plan, Yashika and her family kill Ashok and his friends.

Cast

Production
The production of the film began before Yashika suffered a serious injury in June 2021.

Reception
The film was released on 8 July 2022. A critic from The Times of India wrote "The film starts off as a horror thriller and becomes a revenge drama towards the climax. There are many twists in the second half, but they generate little interest as the director fails to realise that viewers would be interested in the post-interval sequences only if the first half is bearable, which is not the case here". A reviewer from Dina Thanthi called the film "predictable".India herald critic noted that " A worst every movie made"

References

External links

2022 films
2022 drama films
Indian romantic thriller films
2020s Tamil-language films